Andreas Henzen (born 1 January 1955) is a Swiss painter and president of the Swiss Association of Painters, Sculptors and Architects (GSMBA, founded 1865).

References

This article was initially translated from the German Wikipedia.

20th-century Swiss painters
Swiss male painters
21st-century Swiss painters
21st-century Swiss male artists
1955 births
Living people
20th-century Swiss male artists